The Silesian is in the geologic timescale of Europe a series or epoch, a subdivision of the Carboniferous system or period.

It was named for Silesia, a region that stretches over the Czech Republic, Poland and Germany.

Geology
It follows or lies on top of the Dinantian epoch/series and lasted from roughly 326.4 to 299.0 Ma ago.

The base of the Silesian is undefined, the top is defined by the first appearance of the conodont Streptognathodus isolatus.

Subdivisions
The Silesian is subdivided into three stages, from young (upper) to old (lower):
 Stephanian
 Westphalian
 Namurian.

See also

References

Mississippian geochronology
Pennsylvanian geochronology
Carboniferous Europe
Carboniferous Germany
Stratigraphy of Europe
Carboniferous geochronology